Nematasketum (sometimes incorrectly spelt nematosketum) is a nematophyte with internally thickened tubes.  It is thought to be terrestrial or freshwater,
and seems to be aligned with the fungi.

References

Silurian plants